
Gmina Rząśnia is a rural gmina (administrative district) in Pajęczno County, Łódź Voivodeship, in central Poland.

In the municipality of Rząśnia, there is a brown Coal Mine

Villages
Gmina Rząśnia contains the villages and settlements of Augustów, Będków, Biała, Broszęcin, Broszęcin-Kolonia, Gawłów, Kodrań, Krysiaki, Marcelin, Rekle, Rychłowiec, Rząśnia, Ścięgna, Stróża, Suchowola, Suchowola-Majątek, Zabrzezie, Żary and Zielęcin.

Neighbouring gminas
Gmina Rząśnia is bordered by the gminas of Kiełczygłów, Pajęczno, Rusiec, Strzelce Wielkie, Sulmierzyce and Szczerców.

References
 Polish official population figures 2006

Rzasnia
Pajęczno County